Tarkhun (Chinese: 突昏 tū-hūn, died 710) was a Sogdian ruler (Sogdian: ikhshid) of Samarkand from somewhere 705–707 to 710. After receiving the news of the capture of Bukhara by the Umayyad general Qutayba ibn Muslim in 709, Tarkhun sent envoys to the latter and acknowledged the authority of the Umayyad Caliphate. His two sons had to be kept at the Umayyad court as hostages.

However, one year later, Tarkhun was overthrown by a local rebellion because of his pro-Muslim policy, and was succeeded by another Sogdian prince named Gurak, who had Tarkhun imprisoned. Tarkhun shortly after committed suicide. His two sons, however, managed to flee to the court of another Sogdian ruler named Divashtich at Panjikant, where they were treated honorably.

The accession of Tarkhun is reported in the Chinese chronicles of the Tang Huiyao:  "During the years of Shenlong (705-707), Ninieshishi [Mastich-Unash (698-700)] died. And his son Tarkhun was put on the throne". It is also reported in the New Book of Tang: "After his death Mastich-Unash succeeded him. After the death of Mastich-Unash, the people chose Tarkhun as King".

Sources 
Al-Tabari, Abu Ja'far Muhammad ibn Jarir. The History of al-Tabari. Ed. Ehsan Yar-Shater. 40 vols. Albany, NY: State University of New York Press, 1985–2007.
 

Wang Pu, Institutional History of Tang唐会要,volume 99.

References

710 deaths
Sogdian rulers
Year of birth unknown
8th-century Iranian people